Edgewood House may refer to:

 Edgewood House (Pelham Manor, New York), listed on the NRHP in New York
 Edgewood Manor, Clarksburg, West Virginia, listed on the NRHP in West Virginia

See also
Edgewood Historic District (disambiguation)
Edgewood (disambiguation)